is a Japanese smartphone game app developed by Cucuri for iOS and Android devices. The game started servie on November 13, 2014. A short TV anime series premiered in Japan on tvk on April 4, 2015. The game original creator Yoshinobu Sena voices the protagonist and writes the theme song for the anime. The theme song "Everlasting Love" is performed by Nami Tamaki.

Premise
The story of the original game takes place in London shrouded in night, where "Vampire Slasher" incidents have been happening in the streets. The player must work with Holmes, a detective who does not explain mysteries and does not use reasoning skills, to investigate a suspicious mansion and learn the truth.

The anime series features Holmes as the protagonist. He is a private detective who does not reason, or not even explain mysteries. However, he always solves the cases requested. He secretly undertakes a mission from the Metropolitan Police of London to search for vampires.

Characters

A private detective, but against his name, he does not explain mysteries and does not use reasoning skills. He secretly undertakes a mission from the Metropolitan Police of London to search for vampires.

Hudson is Holmes's young assistant.

Kira is Holmes' house cat.

Christina is landlord of the house where Holmes lives.

References

External links
 

2014 video games
2015 anime television series debuts
Adventure games
Android (operating system) games
Anime television series based on video games
Detective video games
IOS games
Mystery video games
Video games about vampires
Video games developed in Japan